Norman Howard "Buster" Mott (June 21, 1909 – November 14, 1987) was an American football back in the National Football League (NFL). Mott played with the Green Bay Packers during the 1933 NFL season. He split the following season between the Cincinnati Reds and the Pittsburgh Pirates.

References

1909 births
1987 deaths
Players of American football from Atlanta
Green Bay Packers players
Cincinnati Reds (NFL) players
Pittsburgh Pirates (football) players
American football defensive backs
Georgia Bulldogs football players
All-Southern college football players
American football halfbacks